Awit sa Paglikha ng Bagong Pilipinas, also known by its incipit Tindig! Aking Inang Bayan, is a patriotic song written by Filipino composer Felipe Padilla de León. It was commissioned during the Japanese occupation of the Philippines and intended to supplant Lupang Hinirang (then sung to its English translation as the Philippine Hymn) as the national anthem. It was also sung by the members of the Hukbo ng Bayan Laban sa Hapon, however, the words bear sentiments against the Japanese occupiers and the desire for national liberation. 

The song was also appropriated by the communist New People's Army with the title Tindig Uring Anakpawis.

The Philippine Madrigal Singers recorded a rendition of the song for the album Bayan Ko, Aawitan Kita ("My Country, I Shall Sing For Thee"), an anthology of historic patriotic songs from the Spanish era up to the 20th century that was released for the Philippine Centennial in 1998.

Lyrics

References

Tagalog-language songs
Filipino patriotic songs
Asian anthems
Philippine anthems